The Tortum Waterfall is the tallest waterfall in Turkey. Since the completion of the Tortum Dam and Hydroelectric Plant in 1960, water is drawn from Tortum Lake through channels and tunnels, and allowed to rush down into the turbines. The waterfall is fed only from the surplus water and thus now functions only for a very short period during the months of May and June when the water level of the lake is exceptionally high. During the other months the bed of the waterfall is almost dry.

Tortum Lake
The hollow left in the Kemerlidağ slope on the left of the valley by the fall of rock is still clearly visible. Tortum Lake is surrounded by limestone marls of the Cretaceous period. Earth pillars can be seen on the eastern shores of the lake. The view of the lake from the steep slopes along the edge is scenic.

Some geologists claim that this landslide is a very old one. These experts, among whom are to be counted a number of foreign geologists, believe that the landslide took place at the end of the Quaternary period. Other opinions state that the landslide is comparatively recent and occurred only a few centuries ago.

A recreation area around the waterfall with an observation platform allows visitors a close sightline to the waterfall. A staircase leads underneath  the waterfall. After the  waterfall (with its drop of ), the river flows over a series of cascades until its arrival in the Tev Valley.

Smaller lakes
Four small lakes were formed on the rubble from the landslide by water seeping from underground through the material from the rock fall. The water of these lakes is remarkably clear and blue. These four lakes, Incegöl, Karagöl, Efendigilin Gölü and Nazlıgilin Gölü, contain large quantities of trout.

External links
www.baliklikoyu.com

Waterfalls of Turkey
Landforms of Erzurum Province
Tourist attractions in Erzurum Province
Landslide-dammed lakes
Lakes of Turkey